The Government College of Science Wahdat Road (GCS) in Lahore, Punjab, Pakistan is located along the Wahdat Road in the locality of Allama Iqbal Town (hence its name).  The college was founded on 8 August 1973; M. A. Saeed was its first principal.

The Institution

The college, by its present name, came into being on 8 August 1973,in compliance with the orders of the then Governor of the Punjab, after merging Government Superior Science College, Lahore and Government Degree College, Wahdat Road, Lahore. At the same time the building which was constructed to house Govt. Intermediate college for Girls, Gulberg, Lahore and which remained unutilized, was also annexed to the college building and was named Government College of Science, Wahdat Road, Lahore. Thus the Government College of Science emerged from the blend of these three institutions and a renowned educationist, Prof. M.A. Saeed was appointed its first principal. The new college started functioning with new vigor, ambitions and targets. The post-graduate teaching was started in Physics (1970), Chemistry (1974), Economics and Mathematics (1994) and Zoology (2005). Dr. Hammad Ashraf the current reregistrar of this institution.

Campus

The college has a separate new block having master classes in mathematics and economics and a newly constructed commerce/computer block to accommodate the increasing number of students and to introduce other teaching disciplines in future.

The college is affiliated with the board of Intermediate & Secondary Education (B.I.S.E) Lahore and the Govt.college University, Faisalabad, for its BS four-year degree program and post-graduate classes.

Academics

The BS four-year program was started in 2010 with the introduction of sixteen disciplines including English, Economics, Islamiat, BBA, Chemistry, Statistics, Physics, Sociology, Botany, Zoology, Mass Communication, Mathematics, Information Technology, Political Science, Education and Urdu.

Self supporting BS Four Years Degree Program was started in 2019. It is only for boys.
The institution is currently offering Degree of English, Botany, Chemistry , BBA, Information Technology, Zoology and Physics.

The college won the Board Championship in boxing in 2004-05. To boost up the sports activity, a boxing ring is being set up on the college campus.

History

The college by its present name came into being on 8 August 1973, in compliance with the orders of the then Governor of the Punjab, after merging Government Superior Science College, Lahore and Government Degree College, Wahdat Road, Lahore. At the same time the building which was constructed to house Government Intermediate college for Girls, Gulberg, Lahore and which remained unutilized, was also annexed to the college building and was named Government College of Science, Wahdat Road, Lahore. M. A. Saeed was appointed its first principal.

Department of English
There is a department of English Language and Literature in the college. This department is located opposite to the principal office. All the teachers of this department are very dedicated and passionate. The faculty of English is considered to be the most powerful in the college as they have the highest number of people in college administration. The department has around 20 members.

These are the notable teachers of this department with high repute in the education sector:-

Prof. Jahangir Rana
 Prof. Dr. Nadeem Anwar
 Prof. Dr. Mooneeb Ali
 Prof. Rana yousaf
 Prof. Anwar ul Haq 
 Prof. Mubasher Sadiq
 Prof. Muhammad Talha

Department of Botany
Dr Abdul Hameed is the Head of Department of Botany. 
Here is the link for Page on Facebook.

Following are the notable teachers and instructors of this department.

 Dr. Muhammad Zia Ur Rehman
 Dr. Abdul Hameed
 Dr. Hammad Ashraf(Now in MAO College)
 Dr. Syed Mukhtar Hussain Shah ( Now Director Colleges, Gujranwala)
Dr. Javed Mustafa (retired)
 Dr. Malik Adil Abbas Awan
Dr. Mehwish (now in GC University)
Yasir Ali

Sports and co-curricular activities

The college has a sports board and a societies board which organize sports and extra-curricular activities.

 Annual Sports Gala
 Hajverian Literary Week

Notable alumni
 Mian Amer Mahmood
 Bilal U. Haq

References

External links
 Official homepage

Universities and colleges in Lahore
Iqbal Town, Lahore
1973 establishments in Pakistan